Jeftha Fetting (born 13 February 1943) is a South African cricketer. He played in three List A and eighteen first-class matches for Border from 1962/63 to 1977/78.

See also
 List of Border representative cricketers

References

External links
 

1943 births
Living people
South African cricketers
Border cricketers